Cyrtopleura is a genus of bivalves belonging to the family Pholadidae.

The species of this genus are found in Europe and America.

Species:

Cyrtopleura costata 
Cyrtopleura crucigera 
Cyrtopleura lanceolata 
Pholas levesquei

References

Pholadidae
Bivalve genera